Elisabeth Micheler-Jones (born 30 April 1966 in Augsburg) is a West German-German slalom canoeist who competed from the mid-1980s to the mid-1990s. Competing in two Summer Olympics, she won a gold medal in the K1 event in Barcelona in 1992.

Micheler-Jones also won four medals at the ICF Canoe Slalom World Championships with two golds (K1: 1991 for Germany, K1 team: 1987 for West Germany) and two bronzes (K1: 1987 for West Germany, K1 team: 1995 for Germany). She also has a silver from K1 team event at the 1996 European Championships in Augsburg.

Her husband, Melvyn Jones of Great Britain, finished seventh in the K1 event at the 1992 Summer Olympics.

World Cup individual podiums

References
DatabaseOlympics.com profile

1966 births
Canoeists at the 1992 Summer Olympics
Canoeists at the 1996 Summer Olympics
West German female canoeists
Living people
Olympic canoeists of Germany
Olympic gold medalists for Germany
Olympic medalists in canoeing
Medalists at the 1992 Summer Olympics
Sportspeople from Augsburg
Medalists at the ICF Canoe Slalom World Championships
German female canoeists